HMS Ross was a  minesweeper of the Aberdare sub-class built for the Royal Navy during World War I. She was not finished in time to participate in the First World War and survived the Second World War to be sold for scrap in 1947.

Design and description
The Aberdare sub-class were enlarged versions of the original Hunt-class ships with a more powerful armament. The ships displaced  at normal load. The ships' complement consisted of 74 officers and ratings.

The ships had two vertical triple-expansion steam engines, each driving one shaft, using steam provided by two Yarrow boilers.

The Aberdare sub-class was armed with a quick-firing (QF)  gun forward of the bridge and a QF twelve-pounder (76.2 mm) anti-aircraft gun aft. Some ships were fitted with six- or three-pounder guns in lieu of the twelve-pounder.

Construction and career
HMS Ross was built by the Lobnitz at their shipyard in Renfrew. She was originally called HMS Ramsey, but was renamed prior to launch.  So far she has been the only ship of the Navy to bear the name Ross, in this case after the Ross hunt.

In 1940, Ross was serving with the 5th Minesweeping Flotilla.  With the rest of her flotilla, she took part in Operation Dynamo, the evacuation of the British Expeditionary Force from Dunkirk, making a number of trips and taking off more than 1,000 men. In 1941, Ross had a narrow escape when attacked by a German bomber a few miles out of Aberdeen: a bomb passed through her bow without exploding, leaving its tail fin behind.

In 1941, during Warship Week, the Admiralty asked all the towns and counties in the country to adopt a ship. As a result, on 6 December 1941, Ross was formally adopted by Ross-on-Wye and the association remained until she was decommissioned in 1945. Ross was then finally sold for scrap on 13 March 1947.

An original Ship's Crest was presented to the town of Ross-on-Wye and it adorned the Mayor's chair in the Town Council Chamber for many years. More recently it has been loaned to TS Ross, the local Sea Cadet Unit, for safe keeping and it can be viewed by the public on their maindeck.

Notes

References
 
 
 
 Ross, Ledbury and Monmouth - Royal Naval Warships The Ross Gazette, Wednesday 17 February 2010
 Out Sweeps! The Story of the Minesweepers in World War II Paul Lund & Harry Ludlam, W Foulsham & Co, 1978, 

 

Hunt-class minesweepers (1916)
Ships built on the River Clyde
1919 ships
World War II minesweepers of the United Kingdom